Honeysuckle Creek Tracking Station (Honeysuckle Creek) was a NASA Earth station in Australia near Canberra, and was instrumental to the Apollo Program. The station was opened in 1967 and closed in 1981.

History 
Honeysuckle Creek – with a 26m dish (now relocated and decommissioned) – is renowned as the station which received and relayed to the world the first televised footage of astronaut Neil Armstrong setting foot on the Moon on 20 July 1969. Apart from television pictures, Honeysuckle Creek and Canberra Deep Space Communications Complex (Tidbinbilla) had communication and telemetry contact with the Eagle lunar and Columbia command modules. Much of this was dramatized as involving Parkes Observatory (Parkes) in the 2000 Australian film The Dish. In fact, Parkes received only the landing footage. Six hours later, the first steps on the Moon were transmitted from Honeysuckle Creek. Although the Parkes antenna was more powerful, the angle of its dish – at a lowermost pitch of 30-degrees and buffeted by wind gusts up to 100 km/h – was not in line to receive signals during the first seven minutes of the Moon Walk. Honeysuckle Creek signals were sent direct to OTC Sydney via Williamdale and Red Hill (Canberra). Working for NASA, Charlie Goodman selected the audiovisual feeds from Honeysuckle Creek and Parkes for worldwide broadcasts.

The Honeysuckle Creek and Tidbinbilla antennas were built and run by NASA, but staffed by Australians. It was the policy of the Australian Government that the director had to be a citizen or permanent resident of Australia. When Apollo missions ended in 1972, Honeysuckle Creek was redirected to the new Skylab program. As well, it was used for experiments with Apollo scientific stations placed on the Moon by astronauts.

At the end of the Skylab program in 1974, Honeysuckle Creek was connected to the Deep Space Network with the designation Deep Space Station 44. Honeysuckle Creek closed in December 1981. The 26m antenna was relocated nearby to the Canberra Deep Space Communications Complex at Tidbinbilla, and redesignated Deep Space Station 46. The Antenna was decommissioned in late 2009. In May 2010, the American Institute of Aeronautics and Astronautics declared the antenna a Historical Aerospace Site. The antenna remains in perpetuity as a historical site at Tidbinbilla.

Today, at Honeysuckle Creek, the concrete foundation is the only remnant of the tracking station. An outdoor display was added in 2001. Honeysuckle Creek is considered the geographical centre of the Australian Capital Territory.

Climate

The climate of Honeysuckle Creek, as to be expected of its much greater elevation, is significantly cooler than that of Canberra. Notwithstanding, its maximum temperatures are warm relative to elevation, due to the fact that it still lay on the leeward (eastern) side of the Brindabella Range.

Annually, it receives 14.4 snowy days on average.

Gallery

See also
 Apollo 11 missing tapes
 Carnarvon Tracking Station
 Orroral Valley Tracking Station
 OTC Satellite Earth Station Carnarvon
 Canberra Deep Space Communication Complex
 History of the Deep Space Network
 Andrew Tink's 2018 book: Honeysuckle Creek: the story of Tom Reid, a little dish and Neil Armstrong’s first step Tom Reid was the Director of Honeysuckle between 1967 and 1970 and in particular on 20–21 July 1969 during Neil Armstrong's moon walk.

References

External links
 A Tribute to Honeysuckle Creek Tracking Station Website
 Canberra Deep Space Communication Complex - NASA's Deep Space Network

Apollo program facilities
NASA facilities in Australia
NASA radio communications and spacecraft tracking facilities
Earth stations in the Australian Capital Territory
1981 disestablishments in Australia
1967 establishments in Australia
Tourist attractions in the Australian Capital Territory
Articles containing video clips